Edward Arthur Plank, born April 9, 1952, is a former Major League Baseball pitcher. He pitched for the San Francisco Giants in 1978 and 1979.

References

San Francisco Giants players
1952 births
Living people
Major League Baseball pitchers
Baseball players from Illinois